Dong Ap Bia (Ap Bia Mountain) is a mountain on the Laotian border of South Vietnam in Thừa Thiên–Huế Province. 
Rising from the floor of the western A Shau Valley, it is a looming, solitary massif, unconnected to the ridges of the surrounding Annamite range. It dominates the northern valley, towering some 937 metres above sea level. Snaking down from its highest peak are a series of ridges and fingers, one of the largest extending southeast to a height of 900 metres, another reaching south to a 916-metre peak. The entire mountain is a rugged, uninviting wilderness blanketed in double- and triple-canopy jungle, dense thickets of bamboo, and waist-high elephant grass. Local Montagnard tribesmen call Ap Bia "the mountain of the crouching beast."

History
In May 1969, a ridge of Dong Ap Bia, "Hill 937" in contemporary US military terminology, was the site of the Battle of Hamburger Hill, a controversial battle of the Vietnam War fought by the United States and South Vietnam against North Vietnamese forces.

References

Mountains of Vietnam
Landforms of Thừa Thiên Huế province
Laos–Vietnam border
Mountains of Laos
International mountains of Asia